The 1941 Texas Mines Miners football team was an American football team that represented Texas School of Mines (now known as University of Texas at El Paso) as a member of the Border Conference during the 1941 college football season. In its 13th and final season under head coach Mack Saxon, the team compiled a 4–5–1 record (3–4 against Border Conference opponents), finished sixth in the conference, and was outscored by a total of 192 to 184.

Halfback Owen Price and guard William Caver were selected by the conference coaches as first-team players on the 1941 All-Border Conference football team. Tackle William Shoopman was named to the second team.

Schedule

References

Texas Mines
UTEP Miners football seasons
Texas Mines Miners football